Joseph Andrew Slusarski (born December 19, 1966) is an American former professional baseball pitcher. He played in Major League Baseball (MLB) from 1991 to 2001 for the Oakland Athletics, Milwaukee Brewers, Houston Astros, and Atlanta Braves.

He helped the Athletics win the 1992 American League Western Division, the Astros win the 1999 and 2001 National League Central Division, and the Braves win the 2001 NL Eastern Division.

In 7 seasons he had a record of 13-21 in 118 games, with a 5.18 ERA.  He was fired as pitching coach for the Frisco RoughRiders on May 20, 2009 and replaced by Jeff Andrews after the RoughRiders went 18-18 with a 4.56 ERA to begin the season.

External links

Major League Baseball replacement players
1966 births
Living people
Modesto A's players
Huntsville Stars players
Tacoma Tigers players
Reading Phillies players
Scranton/Wilkes-Barre Red Barons players
Buffalo Bisons (minor league) players
New Orleans Zephyrs players
Jackson Generals (Texas League) players
New Orleans Privateers baseball players
Richmond Braves players
Oakland Athletics players
Milwaukee Brewers players
Houston Astros players
Atlanta Braves players
Baseball players from Indianapolis
Major League Baseball pitchers
Baseball players at the 1987 Pan American Games
Baseball players at the 1988 Summer Olympics
Sinon Bulls players
American people of Polish descent
Medalists at the 1988 Summer Olympics
Pan American Games silver medalists for the United States
Olympic gold medalists for the United States in baseball
Pan American Games medalists in baseball
Lincoln Land Loggers baseball players
Medalists at the 1987 Pan American Games
American expatriate baseball players in Taiwan
Baseball players from Illinois
Sportspeople from Springfield, Illinois